Anthoactis is a genus of cnidarians belonging to the family Cerianthidae.

The species of this genus are found in Europe.

Species:

Anthoactis armauerhanseni 
Anthoactis australiae 
Anthoactis benedeni

References

Cerianthidae
Anthozoa genera